Valter Matošević (born 11 June 1970) is a former Croatian team handball player who was at the goalkeeper position. He played for professional teams in Croatia, Germany, Spain, Denmark and Italy. He is current handball coach.

He was part of the national team for 12 years and won gold medals at the 1996 Summer Olympics, 2003 World Men's Handball Championship and 2004 Summer Olympics.

Career
Matošević started his career in his hometown club RK Zamet where he competed in Yugoslav First League and Croatian First League. At a very young age he was recognized as a goalkeeper prodigy so at the age of 16 he made his debut for Zamet II.

In 1993 he left to join Badel 1862 Zagreb later Croatia Banka the Croatian handball title holders. At Zagreb Matošević had three successes, winning the league and cup while reaching the Champions League finals in 1995.

He returned to Zamet in 1996, who had just come out of the Croatian Second League, and spent four years there helping return the club to the top of Croatian handball. During this time he captained his team. Later his career took him to Metković Jambo, Bologna 69, Wilhelmshavener HV, two more spells at Zagreb, Poreč, HSG Wetzlar, Portland San Antonio and FCK Håndbold. After playing out of Croatia for a few years Matošević returned to RK Zamet in 2009 to end his career.
 
In December 2010 TuS Nettelstedt-Lübbecke called up Matošević to play for half a season due to the injury of their goalkeeper Nikola Blažičko.

In 2015. he came out of retirement again to play for ThSV Eisenach so they could get promoted to the A rank bundesliga. They finished second in the league and were promoted to the 1. bundesliga.

International career
Matošević made his first appearance for the Yugoslav national team in 1989. He competed for Yugoslavia at 1991 Mediterranean Games in Athens.

He played for the Croatian national team from 1992 till 2004.

Matošević was a member of the Croatian national team that won gold Olympic medals two times: at the 1996 Summer Olympics and at the 2004 Summer Olympics.

He played in the 1994 European Championship, 1995 World Championship, 1996 European Championship, 1997 World Championship, 1998 European Championship, 2000 European Championship 2001 World Championship, 2002 European Championship and 2003 World Championship, where Croatia was the world champion.

He also played in various friendly tournaments for Croatia such as the Croatia Cup, Elfag Cup, Paris tournament and Super League.

Matošević scored a goal against the United States in 2001.
He also scored a goal at the 2003 World Championship Qualification Tournament against Saudi Arabia.

After the 2004 Summer Olympics he went into retirement from the national team.

Coaching career
After his second retirement he started coaching the goalkeepers of Croatia U-19, RK Zamet where he is also the assistant coach and the Croatian national team. Matošević has also been a part of the RINA handball academy, coaching children in Rijeka and Kastav.

On 31 October Željko Babić, the head coach of the Croatian national team, announced that Venio Losert would be the new goalkeeper coach of the national team. Matošević responded three days later stating that Babić didn't even call him to tell him the news. He then gave the players and the team his best wishes.

Personal life
In 2016 he appeared in two documentaries, Od ponora do Olimpa and Prvi Put, which follow the events of the 1996 Summer Olympics in Atlanta where Croatia won their first gold medal in handball.

Honours

Club
RK Zamet
Croatian First A League 
Vice-champions (1): 1992
Croatian Cup 
Finalist (1): 2000
Yugoslav Second League
Winner  (1): 1986-87

RK Zagreb
Croatian First League
Winner (5): 1993-94, 1994–95, 1995–96, 2002–03, 2004–05
Croatian Handball Cup 
Winner (5): 1994, 1995, 1996, 2003, 2005
EHF Champions League 
Runner-up (1): 1995
EHF Cup Winners' Cup 
Finalist (1): 2005

RK Metković
Croatian First League
Vice-champions (1): 2000-01
Croatian Handball Cup 
Winner (1): 2001
EHF Cup 
Finalist (1): 2001

FCK Håndbold
Danish Handball Cup 
Winner (1): 2009

ThSV Eisenach
2. Bundesliga 
Promotion (1): 2014-15

Individual
2nd best goalkeeper at World Championship in Iceland 1995
Best Croatian handballer of 1995 by CHF & Sportske novosti
Sportsperson of the year by Novi list - 1995
Ivica Jobo Kurtini Award - 1995
Franjo Bučar State Award for Sport - 1996 and 2004 
RK Zamet hall of fame - 2015 
 Plack with names of Rijeka's Olympic medalists -2014 
RK Zamet hall of fame - 2015

Records
Record in Croatian national team for the number of saves in one match - 24
Rijeka's sportsperson with the most sports honours

Yugoslavia
1991 Mediterranean Games in Athens - 1st

Croatia
Major tournaments
1994 European Championship in Portugal - 3rd
1995 World Championship in Island - 2nd
1996 European Championship in Spain- 5th
1996 Summer Olympics in Atlanta - 1st
1997 World Championship in Japan - 13th
1998 European Championship in Italy - 8th
2000 European Championship in Croatia - 6th
2001 World Championship in France - 9th
2002 European Championship in Sweden - 16th
2003 World Championship in Portugal - 1st
2004 European Championship in Slovenia - 4th
2004 Summer Olympics in Athens - 1st

Minor tournaments
1996 Stratoil World Cup - 8th
1997 Mediterranean Games in Bari - 1st
1999 Pre-Olympic Tournament - 2nd
1999 Super Cup in Germany - 2nd
2001 Mediterranean Games in Tunis - 1st
2001 Super Cup in Germany - 4th
2003 World Championship Qualification Tournament in Portugal - 1st
2003 Super Cup in Germany - 4th

Friendly tournaments
1997 Paris Tournament - 1st
2000 Croatia Cup - 1st
2002 Elfag Cup - 2nd
2002 Getman Cup - 2nd

Croatia U-19
2013 Youth World Championship - 2nd

Coach
RK Mornar-Crikvenica
Croatian Second League - West (1): 2017-18

Orders
Order of Danica Hrvatska with face of Franjo Bučar - 1995
Order of Duke Trpimir with Neck Badge and Morning Star - 1996
Order of Duke Branimir with Necklace - 2004

References

External links
 Official Olympic reports
 
 
 
 

1970 births
Living people
RK Zamet players
Croatian male handball players
Olympic handball players of Croatia
Olympic gold medalists for Croatia
Handball players at the 1996 Summer Olympics
Handball players at the 2004 Summer Olympics
SDC San Antonio players
RK Zagreb players
HSG Wetzlar players
Olympic medalists in handball
Handball players from Rijeka
Medalists at the 1996 Summer Olympics
Medalists at the 2004 Summer Olympics
Mediterranean Games gold medalists for Yugoslavia
Competitors at the 1991 Mediterranean Games
Competitors at the 1997 Mediterranean Games
Competitors at the 2001 Mediterranean Games
Croatian expatriate sportspeople in Italy
Croatian expatriate sportspeople in Germany
Croatian expatriate sportspeople in Denmark
Croatian expatriate sportspeople in Spain
Mediterranean Games gold medalists for Croatia
RK Zamet coaches
RK Crikvenica coaches
Mediterranean Games medalists in handball